Flowers for Albert is a jazz album by David Murray. It was originally released on the India Navigation label in 1976 and re-released in 1996 with three additional tracks (tracks 2, 4 & 6). It features a live performance by Murray, trumpeter Olu Dara, bassist Fred Hopkins and drummer Phillip Wilson recorded in concert at the Ladies' Fort, NYC.

Reception
The Allmusic review by Scott Yanow awarded the album 4 stars, stating, "The music is often quite free but it also takes its time, showing high energy in well-chosen spots. Since this period David Murray has lived up to his great potential".

Track listing
All compositions by David Murray except as indicated
 "Flowers for Albert" - 14:18
 "Santa Barbara and Crenshaw Follies" - 15:53
 "Joanne's Green Satin Dress" (Morris) - 12:56
 "After All This" - 13:59
 "Roscoe" - 9:05
 "The Hill" - 17:55
 "Ballad for a Decomposed Beauty" - 9:18
Recorded in concert at the Ladies' Fort, NYC, June 26, 1976

Personnel
David Murray - tenor saxophone
Olu Dara - trumpet
Fred Hopkins - bass
Phillip Wilson - drums

References

1976 live albums
David Murray (saxophonist) live albums
India Navigation live albums